William Francis Kissinger (born August 15, 1871 – April 20, 1929), nicknamed "Shang", was a Major League Baseball player. Primarily a pitcher, Kissinger played all or part of three seasons from - for the Baltimore Orioles and St. Louis Browns.

He was born in Dayton, Kentucky and died in Cincinnati.

External links

1871 births
1929 deaths
Major League Baseball pitchers
19th-century baseball players
St. Louis Browns (NL) players
Baltimore Orioles (NL) players
Norfolk Clam Eaters players
Atlanta Atlantas players
Syracuse Stars (minor league baseball) players
Rome Romans players
Oswego Grays players
Baseball players from Kentucky
People from Dayton, Kentucky